Alexandra Kalinovská (born March 14, 1974, in Prague) is a Czech modern pentathlete. She placed 26th in the women's individual event at the 2004 Summer Olympics.

References

External links
 

1974 births
Living people
Czech female modern pentathletes
Olympic modern pentathletes of the Czech Republic
Modern pentathletes at the 2004 Summer Olympics
Sportspeople from Prague